FC Sîngerei  is a Moldovan football club based in Sîngerei, Moldova. They play in the Divizia B, the third tier of Moldovan football.

Achievements
Divizia B
Winners (1): 2015–16

External links
FC Sîngerei on Soccerway.com

Football clubs in Moldova
Association football clubs established in 2011
2011 establishments in Moldova